Syllepte hemichionalis is a moth species in the genus Leucinodes of the family of Crambidae. It is found in Madagascar and on the Comoros.

Subspecies
Syllepte hemichionalis hemichionalis
Syllepte hemichionalis idalis   (Viette, 1958) (Comoros)

References

Moths described in 1900
Moths of Madagascar
Moths of the Comoros
hemichionalis
Taxa named by Paul Mabille